Jakhera Tal (Nepali: जखेरा ताल ) is a lake situated in Ghorahi sub-metropolitan city in Dang District, Nepal. The lake stretchs over 5.5 bigha of land is surrounded by forest and is six-feet deep. There is a temple of Lord Ganesh to its north and Siddeshwar Mahadev Temple to its east.

See also 
 List of lakes of Nepal

References

Lakes of Lumbini Province
Dang District, Nepal